Chester-le-Street is a railway station on the East Coast Main Line, which runs between  and . It is owned by Network Rail and managed by Northern Trains.

History
However, the line was not opened until 2 March 1868, with the powers having been renewed in 1862. At first only freight trains used the route, but passenger services began on 1 December 1868, with the station opening on the same day.

In the 1960s, the station was listed for closure as part of the Beeching Axe, which led to it being mentioned in the song Slow Train by Flanders and Swann. However, the station was saved, and still remains open today.

In February and March 2022, tactile paving was added to the platform edges.

Operator and facilities
Between 1999 and 2018, Chester-le-Track, an independent private limited company, operated the station as an agent for the local franchised train operating company, which at the time of closure was Arriva Rail North. The station's ticket office, waiting area and toilets were staffed six days per week, prior to the building's closure in early 2018.

Following the building's closure, two self-service ticket machines have since been installed on the southbound platform. As of July 2021, the station is partially staffed by Northern Trains.

Services

Northern Trains
Following the May 2021 timetable change, there are three trains per day (Monday to Saturday) heading north towards Newcastle, two of which extend to Carlisle via Hexham. On Sunday, there is a once-daily service to Carlisle. Heading south, there is a once-daily service to Darlington, which extends to Saltburn on Sunday only.

Rolling stock used: Class 156 Super Sprinter and Class 158 Express Sprinter

TransPennine Express
Following the May 2021 timetable change, there is a mostly two-hourly service between Newcastle and Liverpool Lime Street via York, with additional services operating at peak times.

Rolling stock used: Class 185 Desiro

References

External links 
 
 

Railway stations in County Durham
DfT Category F1 stations
Former North Eastern Railway (UK) stations
Railway stations in Great Britain opened in 1868
Railway stations served by TransPennine Express
Northern franchise railway stations
Railway stations